Hepsetus is a genus of African fishes, the African pikes or African pike characins, in the order Characiformes. It is the sole genus in the family Hepsetidae. It was long believed that only a single widespread species existed, H. odoe, but studies in 2011–2013 have shown that this species is restricted to parts of West and Central Africa. The well-known species of southern Africa, including Kafue River, is Hepsetus cuvieri.

Species
There are currently six recognized species in this genus:
 Hepsetus cuvieri (Castelnau, 1861)
 Hepsetus kingsleyae Vreven, Decru & Snoeks, 2013
 Hepsetus lineatus (Pellegrin, 1926)
 Hepsetus microlepis (Boulenger, 1901)
 Hepsetus occidentalis Decru, Snoeks & Vreven, 2013
 Hepsetus odoe (Bloch, 1794)

Synonym:
 Hepsetus akawo Decru, Vreven & Snoeks, 2012 = Hepsetus odoe

References

Characiformes genera
Freshwater fish genera
Freshwater fish of Africa
Taxa named by William John Swainson